Alexander Nikolayevich Porsev (born 21 February 1986) is a Russian former professional road bicycle racer, who rode professionally between 2011 and 2019, for  and .

Major results
Sources:

2008
 5th La Roue Tourangelle
 5th Grand Prix of Moscow
 9th Overall Bałtyk–Karkonosze Tour
 9th Duo Normand (with Dmitry Kosyakov)
2009
 3rd Duo Normand (with Yevgeni Popov)
 5th Grand Prix de la Somme
2010
 Tour du Loir-et-Cher
1st Stages 1 & 3
 2nd Mayor Cup
 2nd Memorial Oleg Dyachenko
 3rd Schaal Sels
 4th Grand Prix de la ville de Nogent-sur-Oise
 6th Overall Okolo Slovenska
1st Stages 1 & 3
 8th Nokere Koerse
2011
 6th Kampioenschap van Vlaanderen
 10th Grand Prix d'Isbergues
2012
 2nd Trofeo Migjorn
 3rd Trofeo Palma
 7th Scheldeprijs
 9th Nokere Koerse
2013
 1st Stage 1 Tour de Luxembourg
 1st Stage 1b (TTT) Settimana Internazionale di Coppi e Bartali
 4th Overall World Ports Classic
2014
 1st  Road race, National Road Championships
 3rd Overall World Ports Classic
 3rd ProRace Berlin
 9th Overall Tour de l'Eurométropole
 10th Overall Three Days of De Panne
 10th Eschborn-Frankfurt – Rund um den Finanzplatz
2015
 6th Clásica de Almería
2016
 1st Stage 4 Tour of Slovenia
 2nd Paris–Bourges
 6th Grand Prix Impanis-Van Petegem
2017
 1st  Road race, National Road Championships
 7th Trofeo Porreres-Felanitx-Ses Salines-Campos
 10th Trofeo Playa de Palma
2018
 2nd Road race, National Road Championships
 8th Coppa Bernocchi

Grand Tour general classification results timeline

References

External links

Alexander Porsev's Profile on Team Katusha

1986 births
Living people
People from Udmurtia
Russian male cyclists
European Games competitors for Russia
Cyclists at the 2019 European Games
Sportspeople from Udmurtia
21st-century Russian people